The 2022 Women's Softball European Championship was an international European softball competition held in Sant Boi, Spain from 24 July to 30 July 2022. This was the 23rd edition of the Women's Softball European Championship.

Round robin 1

Group A

Group B

Group C

Group D

Round robin 2

Group E

Group F

Group G

Final round robin

Group X

Classification stage

Group Y

Bronze medal game

Championship game

Final standings

Qualified teams for 2024 Women's Softball World Cup
The following three teams from Europe qualify for the 2024 Women's Softball World Cup.

1 Bold indicates champions for that year. Italic indicates hosts for that year.

References

External links
 Women's Softball European Championship

European Championship
International sports competitions hosted by Spain
Softball competitions in Spain
Softball European Championship
Women's Softball European Championship
Softball European Championship